Dependent Music was a Canadian independent record label, owned and operated by the artists that were a part of the collective.  Dependent Music was formed by Brian Borcherdt in Yarmouth, Nova Scotia in 1994.  Artists who have released material on Dependent include Contrived, Brian Borcherdt, Jill Barber, Burnt Black, Heavy Meadows, Holy Fuck, Junior Blue, Land of Talk, The Motes and Wintersleep.

Releases

See also
 List of record labels

References

External links
 Dependent Music website at the Internet Archive

Canadian independent record labels
Record labels established in 1994
Indie rock record labels
Alternative rock record labels
Defunct record labels of Canada